Knook Castle is the site of an Iron Age univallate hillfort on Knook Down, near the village of Knook in Wiltshire, England, but within the civil parish of Upton Lovell. It has also been interpreted as a defensive cattle enclosure associated with nearby Romano-British settlements. It is roughly rectangular in plan with a single entrance on the south/southeast side, but with a later break in the wall on the western side.

John Marius Wilson's Imperial Gazetteer of England and Wales (1870–1872) described Knook Castle as follows:

Knook Castle is an ancient single ditched entrenchment, of about 2 acres; is supposed to have been originally a British village, and afterwards a Roman summer camp; and has yielded Roman coins. Traces of another ancient British village are to the N. "The site of these villages", says Sir R. Hoare, "is decidedly marked by great cavities and a black soil; and the attentive eye may easily trace out the lines of houses and the streets, or rather the hollow ways, conducting to them. Numerous tumuli and barrows are in the neighbourhood."

The site and surrounding downs are easily accessible by public footpath, with the Imber Range perimeter path running east to west immediately to the north of the site. Further to the north lies Imber Range, one of the military firing ranges of Salisbury Plain.

Romano British Settlements

Nearby, some 300m to the north of the hillfort, and slightly further to the north east, are the sites of two Romano British settlements of Knook Down East and Knook Down West. They lie approximately 600m apart and are linked by an earlier linear ditch or hollow way.

The northern side of the site has a central area off of which are five trackways that serve a number of enclosures. On the southern side of the site are three enclosures. Between the two areas lies a field system, with the north and south sides linked by a trackway, which follows the line of a pre-Roman linear ditch.

Finds at the sites and the surrounding areas date predominantly from the 2nd to 4th centuries AD, and include bones, bracelets, nails, door-furniture, Roman coins, stone flooring, hearths with painted stucco and brick, and burial remains found with a basalt axe.

Possible associated landscape features also include for extensive surrounding field systems, boundary earthworks, ponds, two corn-drying kilns, and the outline of a possible small amphitheatre, or circus.

Archaeology
Excavations at the hillfort and the surrounding areas have revealed many items from Neolithic, Bronze Age, Iron Age and Romano-British periods. Most of the various finds discovered are now preserved at the Wiltshire Museum in Devizes.

Most recently in the 1950s, the archaeologist Leslie Grinsell has reviewed and indexed the site and surrounding features. Earlier excavations by Sir Richard Colt Hoare and William Cunnington in the 1800s revealed most of the various finds and interments. However, as the three-age system had not yet been introduced, they were unable to date their finds and therefore were at a disadvantage when trying to interpret them. The following table includes for details of the nearby surrounding tumuli, barrows, and other ancient features. The tumuli and barrows are referenced by Grinsells reference system which uses the original parish name. Only the Knook referenced sites are shown here although there are many other Grinsell referenced tumuli also to be found nearby which fall into the adjacent parishes of Chitterne, Codford, and Heytesbury; some of which form part of the Aston Valley Barrow Cemetery, some 2000m to the southeast of the hillfort.

See also 
 List of places in Wiltshire
 List of hillforts in England
 List of hillforts in Scotland
 List of hillforts in Wales

References

Further reading 
 Wiltshire Heritage Museum finds records for Knook

Iron Age sites in England
Buildings and structures in Wiltshire
Hill forts in Wiltshire
Archaeological sites in Wiltshire
History of Wiltshire